Vicoli is a comune and town in the Province of Pescara in the Abruzzo region of Italy  from the provincial capital of Pescara.

References

Cities and towns in Abruzzo